Mary Beth Patterson (born February 19, 1981), known by her stage name Beth Ditto, is an American singer and songwriter most notable for her work with the indie rock band Gossip. Her voice has been compared to Etta James, Janis Joplin and Tina Turner. She disbanded Gossip to pursue a career in fashion, and has since started a solo career. In 2022, she portrayed country singer Gigi Roman on the Fox drama series Monarch.

Life and career
Ditto grew up in a poor family in Arkansas in the southern United States, with her mother, various stepfathers, and six siblingstwo older brothers, an older sister, two younger brothers and a younger sister. She grew up Southern Baptist and Pentecostal, but is now an atheist. At age 13, she moved out of her mother's house and went to live with her aunt. She moved to Olympia, Washington in 1999; then to Portland, Oregon in 2003, where she lives as of 2014. At 18, she discovered bands like Nirvana, Pearl Jam, The Raincoats and Siouxsie and the Banshees.

She fronted the band Gossip from its formation in 1999 until its dissolution in 2016. In addition, she has been involved in other musical projects. In 2008, she contributed vocals to the Crisis charity single "Consequences", a collaboration between various artists. In 2009, she sang on Simian Mobile Disco's track "Cruel Intentions" for their album of collaborations Temporary Pleasure. In 2011, she released her own 4-track Beth Ditto EP, produced by James Ford and Jas Shaw of Simian Mobile Disco, on the re-launched Deconstruction Records. She sang on Blondie's "A Rose by Any Name" from their 2013 album Ghosts of Download. Harrod Horatia, writing in The Telegraph, has said, "Where the stripped-down three-piece Gossip play propulsive, garage band blues, Ditto's own stuff is melancholic, soulful dance music, inspired by 'Eighties disco soul jams' that she loves, and the up-tempo pop-R&B of I Wanna Dance With Somebody-era Whitney Houston."

Ditto, who is openly queer, is well known for her outspoken support of both lesbian, gay, bisexual, and transgender (LGBT), and feminist causes. She has been an advocate for large women being body-positive and has been regularly photographed as an editorial model. She is known for her stage dances and her unique and revealing image. She classes herself as a punk, and thus neither uses deodorant nor shaves under her armpits, having once remarked, "I think punks usually smell." She has cited Cyndi Lauper and Boy George as overall influences and Grace Jones and Peggy Moffitt as her beauty icons. She also stated: "Artists I love, like Siouxsie Sioux and Patti Smith, have such radically different ways of embodying femininity, but they're both amazing punk women. The true heart of feminism isn't about meeting other people's expectations around your body or your gender." She considers her favorite song to be "Oh Bondage Up Yours!" by X-Ray Spex.

She courted mild controversy in 2006 when she claimed to have eaten squirrels as a child.

In 2007–2008, Ditto contributed a fortnightly advice column on body image to The Guardian newspaper entitled 'What would Beth Ditto do?'.

In 2007 she was featured posed nude on the front cover of music magazine NME. Germaine Greer, writing in The Guardian, said the magazine had "enough courage to put the coolest woman on the planet on the cover" whilst acknowledging its limits. In February 2009 bi-annual British style magazine Love featured Ditto posed nude on the front cover of its premiere issue, with prominent public advertising. Emily Hill, writing in The Guardian, was cynical of Love magazine's intentions, writing that "Beth Ditto on Love magazine is not evidence of fashion's new acceptance, but a diversion before emaciated normality returns".

Ditto launched her first plus-size collection for women's clothing retailer Evans on July 9, 2009, in collaboration with head of design Lisa Marie Peacock. Ditto provided sketches and drew inspiration from her favourite vintage and charity shop clothes as well as bands like Blondie, The Slits and Grace Jones, and Art Deco movements. Her second collection for Evans launched in 2010 with just over 20 individual items. Marianne Kirby, writing in The Guardian, said the "collection struck a nerve with its iconic pieces" and that it was an "international success".

She opened (modeled) and closed the Jean Paul Gaultier spring 2011 fashion show during Paris Fashion Week in October 2010.

In June 2012 Ditto collaborated with MAC Cosmetics to create a make up collection.

Ditto released her memoir in 2012 called Coal to Diamonds, which she co-wrote with Michelle Tea. It was positively reviewed in The Guardian and NME.

In July 2013, Ditto married her girlfriend and best friend since she was 18, Kristin Ogata, in Maui, Hawaii. Both were outfitted entirely in white for the occasion; Ditto wore a gown by Jean Paul Gaultier and went barefoot while Ogata wore a jacket, a shirt, shorts, and shoes.

In December 2014, seventeen months after the two first walked down the aisle in a wedding, the couple legally married in their home state of Oregon, having to wait until same-sex marriage became legal there to make their marriage official.

Ditto confirmed the split of the band Gossip to pursue a career in fashion and her solo career in 2016.

In an interview in March 2018, Ditto announced that she and her wife had split and she was dating musician Ted Kwo. Earlier that month, she addressed how her relationship with Kwo, who is an openly transgender man, has urged her to consider the privileges of being perceived as a straight woman. In particular, she spoke about the sharp difference in how she was treated when she was with Ogata: "I was always really afraid, I was always really protective. Straight privilege is real."

In 2018, Ditto made her film acting debut in Gus Van Sant's Don't Worry, He Won't Get Far on Foot. The following year she was cast in On Becoming a God in Central Florida, a Showtime series starring Kirsten Dunst.

Books

Books by Ditto
Coal to Diamonds: A Memoir Co-written with Michelle Tea.
New York, NY: Spiegel & Grau, 2012. . Hardback.
London: Simon & Schuster UK, 2012. . Hardback.
London: Simon & Schuster UK, 2013. . Paperback.

Books with contributions by Ditto
Riot Grrrl: Revolution Girl Style Now! by Nadine Monem. London: Black Dog Publishing, 2007. . Ditto contributes an introduction.

Discography

Albums

Extended plays

Singles

Songs performed on Monarch
"Family Tradition" (with Joshua Sasse, Anna Friel and Iñigo Pascual)
"How Do I Live" (with Anna Friel)
"The Card You Gamble" (with Anna Friel)
"Juice"
"God Knows"
Always on My Mind" (with Trace Adkins)

Filmography

Awards and nominations
 2006 – NME – Cool List – Won
 2007 – Stonewall Awards – Hero of the Year – Nominated
 2007 – NME Awards – Sexiest Woman of the Year – Nominated
 2007 – Virgin Media Music Awards – Legend of the Year – Nominated 
 2007 – PLUG Awards – Female Artist of the Year – Nominated 
 2008 – Glamour Awards – International Artist of the Year – Won
 2017 – Gay Music Chart Awards – Best Lyric Video for "In and Out" – Nominated

References

 
1981 births
American dance musicians
Female models from Arkansas
American feminists
Women post-grunge singers
American women rock singers
Feminist musicians
Kill Rock Stars
Queer feminists
Queer singers
Queer songwriters
Queer memoirists
American LGBT singers
American LGBT songwriters
Living people
Singers from Arkansas
People from Searcy, Arkansas
Synth-pop singers
Musicians from Portland, Oregon
Songwriters from Oregon
Songwriters from Arkansas
LGBT people from Arkansas
LGBT people from Oregon
Singers from Oregon
21st-century American women singers
21st-century American singers
American queer actresses
American atheists
American columnists
20th-century American LGBT people
21st-century American LGBT people